St Ambrose College is a Christian Brothers' Roman Catholic boys' grammar school in Hale Barns, Altrincham, Greater Manchester, England. It was founded in 1946 by Dr Joseph Robertson. In 2012 the school became an academy, and was completely re-built. 
Upon leaving the college, boys are referred to as ‘Old Ambrosians’ and many go on to join the Old Boys' Association.

St Ambrose College is an additional member of the Headmasters' and Headmistresses' Conference.

History
St Ambrose College, was founded during the Second World War by a group of evacuees. Arriving in Hale in 1940 from Les Vauxbelets College in Guernsey, the Brothers, and a small group of students soon found suitable accommodation and re-established their school.

Towards the end of June 1940, when the Channel Islands were about to be occupied by the German army, the parents of boys attending Les Vauxbelets College, were asked to decide whether they should allow their sons to be evacuated to Great Britain or keep them at home with all the attendant risks (hunger, forced labour, etc.).

The college was in the charge of the French Province of the Brothers of De La Salle and they had promised that an appropriate number of the community would accompany the evacuees to care for them and to ensure that, as far as possible, their education did not suffer.

Having started with just the boys from Guernsey, in shared accommodation in Hale and keeping the Guernsey name, Les Vauxbelets College, the Brothers acquired a large house in Bowdon as college premises and permission was obtained for the college to accept local boys. The college adopted the name St Ambrose College after Ambrose Moriarty, then the Roman Catholic Bishop of Shrewsbury.

During the war the college began to grow in popularity, especially as there was no Catholic school for boys in the South Manchester area.

At the end of the war, in the late summer of 1945, the De La Salle Brothers returned to Guernsey, and left a thriving school in the hands of the Irish Christian Brothers. The college moved to fresh premises, a large house with extensive grounds in Hale Barns. The college retains its original badge, motto, and colours to this day.

In 2005, St Ambrose College were national champions in the FIRST Lego League.

In 2010, house groups were reintroduced into the school, following much planning by senior management. Aquinas (blue), Augustine (green), Ignatius (red),  and Newman (yellow) houses are now prominent within the school, especially on uniform, which now entails a coloured badge representing the pupil's house. The Sixth Form has been given a more visible role, giving presentations and talks during assemblies and during a Thursday morning tutor period. Prefects, Senior Prefects, Vice House Captains, House Captains, the Deputy Head Boys, and Head Boys, all have new ties, as well as badges which relate to their house.

St Ambrose College has strong relationships with the history and ethos of Saint Ambrose, for instance the insignia on the old sixth form ties were bee hives as, legend has it a swarm of bees settled on St Ambrose's face whilst he lay in his cradle, leaving behind a drop of honey. His father considered this a sign of his future eloquence and honeyed-tongue. For this reason, bees and beehives often appear in the saint's symbology.

In April 2004, after the school's second bid for specialist status in six months failed, the headmaster Michael Thompson accused the Department of Education of bias. He claimed that when he asked officials why the bid was unsuccessful, he was told that it was "too Catholic". Member of Parliament for Altrincham and Sale West, Graham Brady called for an inquiry to be held. In 2005, St Ambrose College gained specialist status in mathematics and computing, allowing it to give precedence to the named subjects and bringing a capital grant of £150,000 as well as an annual allowance of £120,000. The money has been spent on computers, projectors and generally modernising the classrooms.

The Office for Standards in Education, Children's Services and Skills (Ofsted) carried out an inspection in November 2005. The report noted that the school's buildings were "old and cramped and at times this makes learning difficult". St Ambrose College, which was considered the school in Trafford "most in need of a new building", was awarded £17 million in July 2006 to completely rebuild. Construction company Balfour Beatty was awarded the contract in January 2010 after a bidding process.

There was originally a miniature Celtic cross buried in the foundations of the school.

In September 2012 the school was opened, and had an official opening ceremony and Mass on 8 October 2012.

The design of the school is a Celtic cross.

It has a six-lane swimming pool, after the old one was decommissioned in 2005. It has a large sports hall above it, and a fitness suite. These facilities are open most lunch times, as well as before and after school for students to use. The sports section has its own reception that is not used, and can be separated from the main building using a roller shutter. This is so it can be opened to the public, with the rest of the school being shut off. The school also has a lecture theatre, as well as an all day cafe for students and staff.

In September 2019, low numbers of Latin students in the then Lower 6th Form led to lessons taking place during school time at Loreto Grammar. This is thought to be the first time that Ambrosians attended Loreto Grammar. Their official status at Loreto has never been officially established, although lessons continued for the whole of the two-year course.

Results
In 2010, the Trafford Local Education Authority was ranked seventh out of 150 in the country – and first out of Greater Manchester's 10 LEAs – based on the percentage of pupils attaining at least 5 A*–C grades at General Certificate of Secondary Education (GCSE) including maths and English (100% compared with the national average of 50.7%). St Ambrose College was the sixth out of 19 secondary schools in the borough in terms of proportion of pupils achieving at least five GCSEs A*–C (92%). For A-level results, the school was ranked fifth out of nine schools in Trafford, with pupils averaging 955.7 points compared to the national average of 739.1.

Child abuse
In December 2012, the college was implicated in a child sex abuse case involving teaching staff carrying out acts of abuse both on and off school grounds. More than fifty former pupils contacted police, either as victims of, or witnesses to, sexual abuse. The alleged sexual abuse, including molestation of children while corporal punishment was administered, stemmed from 1962 onward to this day.

On 15 July 2013, Mr Alan Morris, a former teacher was charged with 41 counts of indecent assault following an investigation into historical sexual abuse at the school.  He is accused of committing the offences between 1972 and 1991 and the allegations involve 29 former pupils of the boys-only school, who were between 11 and 17 at the time.  He was also charged with one count of outraging public decency and five of inciting gross indecency. He was found guilty, and sentenced to nine years jail in August 2014. An overall total of 47 indictments were issued, with at least 27 made public since Morris was convicted.

Although no current staff were said to be involved in the abuse, in November 2014, two long-serving senior teachers at the school were suspended following allegations that they had knowledge of the crimes concerning Alan Morris at the time. They were both later cleared, and returned to teach at the school in June 2015. In 2018, the school issued a "full and unreserved" apology to victims of Morris.

A book named Tell the Truth and Shame the Devil by David Nolan tells the inside story of the biggest historic sex abuse case ever mounted by Greater Manchester Police, was published in July 2015.

Covid-19 response 
Following government advice, the college gradually closed down in late March 2020 in order to protect students and teachers. This began on Thursday 19 March when most of the 2nd Year and 3rd Year boys were told not to attend lessons. This was followed with 1st Year boys told not to attend lessons on 20 March. The school remained open in a reduced capacity for students whose parents worked in the health service. Although GCSEs and A-levels did not take place, Lower Sixth mocks did go ahead. St Ambrose College was then largely closed until 3 September 2020, when the school reopened to 1st Year and 5th Year boys and gentlemen of the Sixth Form. The school was reopened to all year groups from 4 September onwards.

 The Sixth Form Common Room and the 'Nest', both being on the 2nd Floor, were inaccessible to Sixth Formers. However, with the gym unusable, a compromise was reached. As the Gym is only accessible via the Sports Corridor on the Ground Floor, it was converted into a Common Room. Therefore, the gym equipment was replaced with tables and some chairs. The tradition that only Upper Sixth have access to the Common Room has not continued.
On 28 September, confirmed coronavirus cases in Upper Sixth and Third Year meant that both year groups were told to stay at home. Individual students who needed to self-isolate were identified, allowing all other students to return to school the following day. Similarly, on 2 October, a confirmed case in the Fourth Year required them to stay at home for teachers to identify the specific students who would need to self-isolate.

Notable former pupils

Alumni of St Ambrose College include:

Academia 

Sir John Bernard Pethica, Professor of Material Sciences at Trinity College, Dublin
Kieran Moriarty, physician, scientist

Athletes 

 Luke Adamson, English rugby league and rugby union footballer
Mark Atkinson, rugby union footballer
Ciaran Booth, rugby union footballer
Connor Doherty, English rugby Union footballer
Charlie Mulchrone, English rugby union footballer
Ciaran Parker, English rugby union footballer
Mike Worsley, former rugby union footballer for England and Harlequins
Toby Adamson, rugby league footballer
Raffi Quirke, English rugby union footballer

Arts and entertainment 

 Keith Breeden, artist and creator of the cover for Pink Floyd's album The Division Bell
 Lonnie Donegan, musician/entertainer
 Malcolm Garrett, graphic designer (album covers for Buzzcocks and Duran Duran)
 David Nolan, author
 Peter Saville, graphic designer (album covers for New Order and Joy Division)
 Martin Baker, former President of the Royal College of Organists and Master of Music at Westminster Cathedral from 2000 to 2019

Business 

 Sir Andrew Dillon, chief executive

Politics 

Damian Hinds, Conservative Party Member of Parliament for East Hampshire and former Secretary of State for Education
Paul Maynard, Conservative Party Member of Parliament for Blackpool North and Cleveleys
Greg Mulholland, Liberal Democrat Member of Parliament for Leeds North West

Science 

 Sir John Hardy, human geneticist and molecular biologist

Religion 

Philip Egan, Bishop of Portsmouth and Vicar General of Shrewsbury

Headmasters 

 Brother J. J. Dowling (1945-1948)
 Brother E. L. Casey (1948-1954)
 Brother D. C. Phelan (1954-1958)
 Brother P. C. Carey (1958-1961)
 Brother W. D. Foley, O.B.E. (1961-1967)
 Brother J. C. Gleeson (1967-1973)
 Brother J. C. Ring (1973-1979)
 Brother P. F. Rynne (1979–83)
 Brother J. J. Sheehan (1983-1984)
 Brother T. C. Coleman (1984–91)
 Mr G. E. Hester (1991-1999)
 Mr P. Howard (1999-2000)
 Mr M. D. Thompson (2000-2015)

Principals 

 Mr J. M. Keulemans (2015-2017)
 Mr D. Rainey (2017–Present)

Notes

References

External links
St Ambrose Prep School
St Ambrose College Online 
St Ambrose Old Boys 

Educational institutions established in 1946
Catholic secondary schools in the Diocese of Shrewsbury
Congregation of Christian Brothers secondary schools
Boys' schools in Greater Manchester
Grammar schools in Trafford
1946 establishments in England
Altrincham
Academies in Trafford